Who's Next is the fifth album by the British rock group The Who.

Who's Next may also refer to:
 "Who's Next", a 1965 song by Tom Lehrer from the album That Was the Year That Was
 Yahoo!'s Who's Next, a service offered by Yahoo! Music
 "Who Next", a 1993 song by Spragga Benz